Missoula County  is located in the State of Montana. As of the 2020 census, the population was 117,922, making it Montana's third-most populous county. Its county seat and largest city is Missoula. The county was founded in 1860.

Missoula County comprises the Missoula, MT Metropolitan Statistical Area.

History
Missoula County, Washington Territory was incorporated in 1860, when this area was still part of Washington Territory. Missoula County encompassed present-day Missoula and Deer Lodge Counties, as well as a large area of land north and south of present-day Missoula County. Hell Gate Town, the county seat, was at the confluence of the Clark Fork and Bitterroot Rivers.

The area encompassing today's Missoula County became part of the United States as a result of Oregon Treaty of June 14, 1846. It was part of the Oregon Territory's Clark County, which replaced the District of Vancouver September 3, 1844. The territory was divided on March 2, 1853, with Clark County becoming part of the new Washington Territory. Clark County was divided the next year to create Skamania County, which a month later was divided to create Walla Walla County, which was further divided in 1858 to create Spokane County. On December 14, 1860, Missoula County was carved out of Spokane County with the first county seat at Hell Gate. The county made up the region between modern-day Idaho and the Continental Divide north of the 46th parallel. When Idaho Territory was created in 1863 it adopted Missoula County as the territory's 3rd county on January 16, 1864, with more or less the same boundaries and Wordensville (present Missoula) established as the county seat. This first county consisted of all or part of current Ravalli, Missoula, Granite, Deer Lodge, Silver Bow, Powell, Mineral, Lake, Sanders, Lincoln, Flathead, and Glacier Counties.

Missoula County became a part of Montana Territory when the territory was organized out of the existing Idaho Territory by Act of Congress and signed into law by President Abraham Lincoln on May 26, 1864. At this time Deer Lodge County (today Deer Lodge, Granite, Silver Bow, and Powell Counties) was cut out of Missoula. The creation of Flathead (today Flathead and Lincoln Counties) and Ravalli Counties in 1893, Powell in 1901, Sanders in 1905, Mineral in 1914 and finally Lake County in 1923 gave Missoula its present borders.

Geography
It is the 24th largest county in Montana.

Geographic features
Five large valleys and two major rivers wind through this mountainous region.

Flora and fauna
Located in the Northern Rockies, Missoula County has a typical Rocky Mountain ecology. Local wildlife includes white-tailed deer, black bears, osprey, and bald eagles. During the winter months, rapid snow melt on Mount Jumbo due to its steep slope leaves grass available for grazing elk and mule deer. The rivers around Missoula provide nesting habitats for bank swallows, northern rough-winged swallows and belted kingfishers. Killdeer and spotted sandpipers can be seen foraging insects along the gravel bars.  Other species include song sparrows, catbirds, several species of warblers, and the pileated woodpecker. The rivers also provide cold, clean water for native fish such as westslope cutthroat trout and bull trout. The meandering streams also attract beaver and wood ducks.

Native riparian plant life includes sandbar willows and cottonwoods, and Montana's state tree, the ponderosa pine. Other native plants include wetland species such as cattails and beaked-sedge as well as shrubs and berry plants like Douglas hawthorn, chokecherry, and western snowberries. Missoula is also home to several noxious weeds which multiple programs have tried to eliminate.  Notable ones include Dalmatian toadflax, spotted knapweed, leafy spurge, St. John's wort, and sulfur cinquefoil. The Norway maples that line many of Missoula's older streets have also been declared an invasive species.

Climate
Missoula County has a semi-arid climate (Köppen climate classification BSk), with cold and moderately snowy winters, hot and dry summers, and spring and autumn are short and crisp in between. Winter conditions are usually far milder than much of the rest of the state due to its western position within the state. However the mildness is also induced by the dampness, as unlike much of the rest of the state, precipitation is not at a strong minimum during winter. Winter snowfall averages , with most years seeing very little of it from April to October. However, temperature differences between day and night are large during this time and from April to October, due to the relative aridity.

National protected areas

 Bitterroot National Forest (part)
 Flathead National Forest (part)
 Lolo National Forest (part)
 Rattlesnake National Recreation Area

Major highways

  Interstate 90
  U.S. Highway 12
  U.S. Highway 93
  Montana Highway 83
  Montana Highway 200

Adjacent counties

 Mineral County - west
 Sanders County - northwest
 Lake County - north
 Flathead County - northeast
 Powell County - east
 Granite County - southeast
 Ravalli County - south
 Idaho County, Idaho - southwest/Pacific Time Border
 Clearwater County, Idaho - southwest/Pacific Time Border

Demographics

2000 census
As of the 2000 United States census, there were 95,802 people, 38,439 households, and 23,140 families in Missoula County. The population density was 37 people per square mile (14/km2). There were 41,319 housing units at an average density of 16 per square mile (6/km2). The racial makeup of the county was:
 94.02% White
 0.27% Black or African American
 2.29% Native American
 1.02% Asian
 0.08% Pacific Islander
 0.45% from other races
 1.86% from two or more races.

1.61% of the population were Hispanic or Latino of any race. 22.7% were of German, 13.0% Irish, 10.4% English, 8.5% Norwegian and 5.6% American ancestry.

There were 38,439 households, out of which 29.20% had children under the age of 18 living with them, 47.40% were married couples living together, 9.20% had a female householder with no husband present, and 39.80% were non-families. 28.00% of all households were made up of individuals, and 7.50% had someone living alone who was 65 years of age or older. The average household size was 2.40 and the average family size was 2.96.

The county population contained 22.90% under the age of 18, 15.40% from 18 to 24, 29.20% from 25 to 44, 22.60% from 45 to 64, and 10.00% who were 65 years of age or older. The median age was 33 years. For every 100 females there were 99.90 males. For every 100 females age 18 and over, there were 98.00 males.

The median income for a household in the county was $34,454, and the median income for a family was $44,865. Males had a median income of $31,605 versus $21,720 for females. The per capita income for the county was $17,808. About 8.80% of families and 14.80% of the population were below the poverty line, including 14.60% of those under age 18 and 8.20% of those age 65 or over.

2010 census
As of the 2010 United States census, there were 109,299 people, 45,926 households, and 25,931 families residing in the county. The racial makeup of the county was 92.7% white, 2.6% American Indian, 1.1% Asian, 0.4% black or African American, 0.1% Pacific islander, 0.4% from other races, and 2.6% from two or more races. Those of Hispanic or Latino origin made up 2.6% of the population. In terms of ancestry, 26.1% were German, 17.8% were Irish, 12.3% were English, 7.3% were Norwegian, and 5.4% were American.

Of the 45,926 households, 26.5% had children under the age of 18 living with them, 42.9% were married couples living together, 9.2% had a female householder with no husband present, 43.5% were non-families, and 30.3% of all households were made up of individuals. The average household size was 2.30 and the average family size was 2.88. The median age was 34.3 years.

The median income for a household in the county was $42,887 and the median income for a family was $58,302. Males had a median income of $39,603 versus $30,069 for females. The per capita income for the county was $24,343. About 8.8% of families and 17.3% of the population were below the poverty line, including 14.9% of those under age 18 and 8.8% of those age 65 or over.

Economy
Missoula County has a diverse economy as a growing regional trade center with several major employers such as the University of Montana, regional hospitals, and the U.S. Forest Service each employing thousands. However, 90% of wage and salary workers work for small businesses with under 20 workers with a quarter of them self-employed.

Law and government
Missoula County is governed by a Board of County Commissioners of three members; each serving six-year terms staggered so as to have one election every two years.  The commission has authority over all legislative, executive, and administrative issues throughout the county not specifically reserved by law or ordinance to other elected officials.

Originally a swing county, Missoula County has voted reliably Democratic since 2004, and has voted Republican only once since 1988. In 2000, Republican George W. Bush won the county by a 9% margin while Green Party candidate Ralph Nader received over 16% of the vote in the county. This is most likely due to the city of Missoula being home to the University of Montana.

Education

School districts
Missoula County is home to 18 school districts (13 Elementary, 2 Secondary, and 3 Unified).

Elementary
 Arlee
 Bonner
 Clinton
 De Smet
 Hellgate
 Lolo
 Missoula
 Potomac
 Seeley
 Sunset
 Swan Valley
 Target Range
 Woodman

Secondary
 Arlee
 Missoula

Unified
 Alberton
 Florence-Carlton
 Frenchtown

Colleges and universities
Missoula County is home to the University of Montana and the Missoula College - University of Montana.

Communities

City
 Missoula (county seat)

Census-designated places

 Bonner-West Riverside
 Carlton
 Clinton
 Condon
 East Missoula
 Evaro
 Frenchtown
 Huson
 Lolo
 Orchard Homes
 Piltzville
 Potomac
 Seeley Lake
 Turah
 Twin Creeks
 Wye

Other unincorporated communities

 Clearwater
 Coloma
 Greenough
 Hell Gate
 Lolo Hot Springs
 Lothrop
 Milltown
 Nagos
 Ninemile
 Sunset
 Westview Park
 Yreka

See also
 List of lakes in Missoula County, Montana
 List of mountains in Missoula County, Montana
 Milltown State Park
 National Register of Historic Places listings in Missoula County, Montana

References

External links

 Missoula County official website
 Missoula County (Mont.) Records, 1888-1963 (University of Montana Archives)

 
Montana placenames of Native American origin
1860 establishments in Washington Territory
Populated places established in 1860